Luke Guthrie (born January 31, 1990) is an American professional golfer.

Born in Quincy, Illinois, Guthrie played college golf at the University of Illinois. In his time at U of I, Guthrie won seven collegiate tournaments, including two Big Ten Conference Championships.

Upon completion of his senior season at Illinois, Guthrie became professional and began playing on the Web.com Tour in 2012, while still taking university courses. In his first five professional golf outings, Guthrie secured four top-10 finishes. In his sixth appearance, Luke won the Albertsons Boise Open. Guthrie followed that victory with a second tournament win, just weeks later at the WNB Golf Classic. He also played three events on the PGA Tour in 2012, finishing in the top-20 in each. Guthrie's best finish was a tie for fifth place at the John Deere Classic.

Professional wins (2)

Web.com Tour wins (2)

Web.com Tour playoff record (0–1)

Results in major championships

CUT = missed the half-way cut
"T" = tied

U.S. national team appearances
Amateur
 Junior Ryder Cup: 2004

See also
2012 Web.com Tour graduates

References

External links

University of Illinois profile

American male golfers
Illinois Fighting Illini men's golfers
PGA Tour golfers
Korn Ferry Tour graduates
Golfers from Illinois
Sportspeople from Quincy, Illinois
Sportspeople from Champaign, Illinois
1990 births
Living people